Lahr (Schwarzw) station is the station of the town of Lahr (also known as Lahr/Schwarzwald, meaning Lahr in the Black Forest) on the Rhine Valley Railway in the German state of Baden-Württemberg. It was opened on 1 August 1845 with the section of Rhine Valley Railway between Offenburg and Freiburg and lies a few kilometres west of the town's centre.

Name 
The station is on the boundaries of Dinglingen, which was a separate municipality until 1933. Until the incorporation of Dinglingen into Lahr, the station was called Dinglingen. After its incorporation, Deutsche Reichsbahn called the station Lahr-Dinglingen. After the former Lahr Stadt (Lahr town) station lost its passenger services in 1959, Deutsche Bundesbahn gave the station its present name in 1962.

History 
From 1865, there was a short branch line to Lahr Stadt. In 1959, Deutsche Bundesbahn ended passenger services on the line and in 1995 it also ended freight services.

From 1894 to 1959, there was also a transfer track to the metre gauge railway of the Central Baden Railways (Mittelbadischen Eisenbahnen), which had a level crossing over the Rhine Valley Railway until 1910, when the crossing was replaced by a bridge. There was a station on the metre-gauge line to the east of the bridge, about 250 m from the standard gauge station, which allowed the interchange of passengers.

Rail services 
The station is served by Regionalbahn and Regional-Express services and has had an Intercity service daily each way between Basel and Munich since 16 December 2013 and a TGV service daily each way between Freiburg and Paris since 9 December 2018.

References 

Railway stations in Baden-Württemberg
Mannheim–Karlsruhe–Basel railway
Railway stations in Germany opened in 1845
1845 establishments in Baden
Buildings and structures in Ortenaukreis